Guledgudda  is a town in the Indian state of Karnataka. It was earlier a part of the Badami taluk, but is now the headquarters of the Guledgudda taluk in Bagalkot district.

Demographics 
, Guledgudda had a population of 33,991. Males constituted 50% of the population and females 50%. Guledgudda had an average literacy rate of 66%, higher than the national average of 59.5%: male literacy was 76%, and female literacy was 55%. In Guledgudda, 12% of the population was under 6 years of age.

References 

Cities and towns in Bagalkot district